The Brunau is a small river,  long, in the district of Soltau-Fallingbostel, on the Lüneburg Heath in North Germany. It rises south of Niederhaverbeck in the Lüneburg Heath Nature Reserve. Near , a village in the northeastern part of Bispingen,  it discharges into the Luhe from the left bank. The water quality of the worsens as it flows downstream from north of Bispingen to its confluence with the Luhe, going from Class II: moderately polluted, to Class II – III: critically polluted.

See also 
List of rivers of Lower Saxony

References 

Rivers of Lower Saxony
Lüneburg Heath
Rivers of Germany
Heidekreis